Kentucky Hearts is the eighth studio album by American country pop band Exile. It was released in 1984 via Epic Records. The album peaked at number 1 on the Billboard Top Country Albums chart. "Just in Case" was later a number 1 hit for The Forester Sisters, whose version appears on their 1985 self-titled debut album.

Track listing
All songs written by J.P. Pennington and Sonny LeMaire except "Comin' Apart at the Seams", written by Jerry Marcum and Les Taylor.

Personnel
Steve Goetzman - drums
Marlon Hargis - keyboards
Sonny LeMaire - bass guitar, background vocals
J.P. Pennington - guitar, lead vocals, background vocals
Les Taylor- guitar, lead vocals, background vocals

Strings arranged by D. Bergen White

Charts

Weekly charts

Year-end charts

References

1984 albums
Exile (American band) albums
Epic Records albums